Nature photography is a wide range of photography taken outdoors and devoted to displaying natural elements such as landscapes, wildlife, plants, and close-ups of natural scenes and textures. Nature photography tends to put a stronger emphasis on the aesthetic value of the photo than other photography genres, such as photojournalism and documentary photography.

"Nature photography" overlaps the fields of—and is sometimes considered an overarching category including -- "wildlife photography," "landscape photography," and "garden photography".

Nature photographs are published in scientific, travel and cultural magazines such as National Geographic Magazine, National Wildlife Magazine and Audubon Magazine or other more specific magazines such as Outdoor Photographer and Nature's Best Photography. Well known nature photographers include Ansel Adams, Eliot Porter, Frans Lanting, Galen Rowell, and Art Wolfe.

Wildlife photography

Wildlife photography is all about capturing animals in their natural habitats. The animals are often photographed in action, such as eating, fighting, or in flight. Alternatively, more static portraits may be used to show detail of the animal or to depict it in its environment. Captive or controlled animals are often photographed instead of true wild specimens, although it is arguable as to whether this constitutes true wildlife photography.

The world's largest photography organizations, the Photographic Society of America, the Fédération Internationale de l'Art Photographique and the Royal Photographic Society, have agreed on a definition for nature and wildlife photography that will be applied to photography competitions. The techniques of wildlife photography differ greatly from those used in landscape photography. For example, in wildlife photography wide apertures are used to achieve a fast shutter speed, freeze the subject's motion, and blur the backgrounds, while landscape photographers prefer small apertures. Wildlife is also usually shot with long telephoto lenses from a great distance; the use of such telephoto lenses frequently necessitates the use of a tripod (since the longer the lens, the harder it is to handhold). Many wildlife photographers use blinds or camouflage.

Macro and texture

The macro photography article explains close-up photography in general; however, this is also a type of nature photography. While common macro subjects – bees, dragonflies, and so on – could be described as wildlife, their world also makes for good photography.

Many photographers record images of the texture in a stone, tree bark, leaf, or any of other small scenes. Many of these images are abstract. Tiny plants and mushrooms are also popular subjects. Close-up nature photography doesn't always need a true macro lens; however, the scenes here are small enough that they are generally considered different from regular landscapes.

Use of color
Color images are not a requirement of nature photography. Ansel Adams is famous for his black-and-white depictions of nature, while Galen Rowell praised Fujifilm Velvia film for its bright, saturated colors, asking "Who wants to take dull pictures that will last a hundred years?" Both men distinguish between photography as an expressive art form and sensitometry; an accurate reproduction is not necessary.

Ethics
A number of ethical concerns and debates surround the creation of nature photography. Common issues involve the potential of stress or harm to wildlife, the potential of photographers overrunning and destroying natural areas, the use of game farms, and veracity and manipulation in photography. 
Also the information posted by photographers on social media of the location of endangered species leads to poachers using this information to hunt these animals.

See also
 Digiscoping
 Escape distance of animals
 Landscape photography
 Wildlife photography

References

External links

 What is 'Nature' in Nature Photography?